Borys Mychajlowytsch Sabarko is a Ukrainian historian and president of the Ukrainian association of concentration camps and ghetto surviving.

Life 
Sabarko escaped the ghetto of Sharhorod as a child. After the Second World War he studied at the University of Czernowitz, and made his Phd's at the institute for history at the National Academy of Sciences of Ukraine in Kiev, where the promovated in 1971. From 1969 until 1988 he worked as a research assistant at the institute for history. From 1971 until 1991 he was a member of the Soviet – German commission of historians, from 1989 until 2002 research assistant at the Institute for Global Economy and International Relations of the National Academy of Sciences of Ukraine.
 
Sabarko is the author of about 200 books and articles, published in Israel, Austria, Russia, Czechoslovakia, the Ukraine and Hungary. In Germany a book series on the Shoa in the Ukraine and a remembrance book, published by himself, were released. Furthermore, he is the initiator of a record – keeping project about antisemitic writings and violent crimes in the Ukraine. Since 1998 he is the director of the Institute for Social and Parish Workers and since 2004 president of the Ukrainian association of former Jewish prisoners of ghetto and Nazi concentration camps.

On 21 October 2009 he was awarded the Order of Merit of the Federal Republic of Germany. He was the seventh Ukrainian to do so.

References

External links
 (German)
Історія України - History of Ukraine (Інститут історії України) (Ukrainian)

20th-century Ukrainian historians
Living people
Recipients of the Cross of the Order of Merit of the Federal Republic of Germany
Year of birth missing (living people)
Chernivtsi University alumni
Laureates of the State Prize of Ukraine in Science and Technology